Celestus microblepharis, the small-eyed galliwasp or tiny eyelid galliwasp, is a species of lizard in the Diploglossidae family.
It is found only in Jamaica.

References

 Gibson, R. 1996.  Celestus microblepharis.   2006 IUCN Red List of Threatened Species.   Downloaded on 18 July 2007.

Celestus
Reptiles described in 1959
Taxa named by Garth Underwood
Taxonomy articles created by Polbot